Solidago ericamerioides is rare Mexican species of flowering plants in the family Asteraceae. It has been found only in the state of Nuevo León in northeastern Mexico.

Solidago ericamerioides is a diminutive species growing on gypsum soils. The plant is a perennial rarely more than 17 cm (6.8 inches) tall. Leaves are up to 2.0 cm (0.8 inches) long. Flower heads are yellow, in flat-topped arrays of no more than 20 heads.

References

External links
 Photo of herbarium specimen collected in Nuevo León in 1984

ericamerioides
Flora of Nuevo León
Plants described in 1989